Growin' Up is the eleventh regular studio album by European-American pop group The Kelly Family. Based on  concept by Dan Kelly, it was co-produced by Kathy and Paddy Kelly and released in 1997 (see 1997 in music) throughout most of Europe.

Track listing

Personnel
Credits are taken from the album's liner notes.

Instruments and performances

 Johann Daansen – flute, piano
 Angelo Kelly – bongos, drums, shaker, tambourine, timbales, vocals
 Barby Kelly – congas, shaker, tambourine, vocals
 Jimmy Kelly – electric guitar, vocals
 Joey Kelly – acoustic guitar, electric guitar, 12-string, vocals
 John Kelly – acoustic guitar, maracas, mandolin, tremolo guitar, vocals

 Kathy Kelly – accordion, Hammond, keyboard, organ, vocals
 Maite Kelly – bass, congas, shaker, vocals
 Patricia Kelly – hammond organ, harp, keyboard, vocals
 Paddy Kelly – acoustic guitar, bass, e-bow guitar, electric guitar, keyboard, piano, 12-string, vocals
 Munich Philharmonic Orchestra – various
 Kristian Schulze – conduction

Technical and production

 Album concept: Dan Kelly
 Mastering: Georgi Nedelschev, Dieter Wegner
 Mixing engineers: Günther Kasper, Thomas Brück, Hartmur Pfannmüller, Max Volume, Stuart Bruce, Jürgen Lusky
 Recording engineers: Chris Brown, Stuart Bruce, Thomas Brück, Steve Bush, Massimo Carola, Renny Hill, Günther Kasper, Jürgen Lusky, Max Volume

 Assistant engineers: Alessandro Benedetti, Pat Grogan, Nick Friend, Tobias Nievelstein, Richard Rainey, Nico Schütte, Graham Stewart
 Cover design: Heidi Mösl, Dan Kelly, Thomas Stachelhaus
 Photography: Thomas Stachelhaus
 Styling: Uschi Ries
 Litho: RGI Dortmund, Germany

Charts

Weekly charts

Year-end charts

Certifications

References

External links
 KellyFamily.de — official site

1997 albums
The Kelly Family albums